Paramorpha hapalopis is a moth in the Carposinidae family. It is found in Australia, where it has been recorded from Western Australia.

References

Natural History Museum Lepidoptera generic names catalog

Carposinidae
Moths described in 1910